is a Japanese department store chain, principally located in the Kansai region of Japan. The chain is operated by Daimaru Matsuzakaya Department Stores, a subsidiary of J. Front Retailing. At one time Daimaru was an independent company, headquartered in Chūō-ku, Osaka.

It has been a member of the International Association of Department Stores from 1962 to 1982. As of 2016, Daimaru had seven stores in Japan, and employed about 3,000 people.

History

Daimaru traces its history to Dai-Monjiya, a dry goods store in Kyoto founded by Shimomura Hikoemon Masahiro in 1717. The name "Daimaru" was first used for a store in Nagoya called Daimaruya, which opened in 1728.

The chain was incorporated in 1907 and reincorporated as Daimaru Dry Goods K.K. in 1920, changing its name to Daimaru in 1928. For several years in the 1960s, Daimaru was the largest retailer in Japan. 

In 1960, Daimaru established a subsidiary called Peacock Sangyo. Now known as Daimaru Peacock, it operates 49 supermarkets in the Greater Tokyo Area, 28 in the Kansai region and 8 in the Chūbu region.

International Expansion and closures
Daimaru expanded to Malaysia 1942 opening in Penang and later Singapore establishing a presence in November 1983 when Liang Court was opened. Diamaru would later close and reopen in 2003.

Its opened in Hong Kong in 1960 lasting until its exit from Hong Kong in 1998, 

In the late 1964, it was the first Japanese department store to open in Thailand, under the name Thai Daimaru.

It opened its first store outside of Asia in Australia at Melbourne, Australia in 1991 operating across six levels of the Melbourne Central (in direct competition with Myer and David Jones Limited). A second Australian store announced in 1996 opened on the Gold Coast in 1998. Diamaru announced its departure from the Australian market after nearly a decade of low profits in September 2001 commencing closure of both stores in late 2002.

In 1998, Daimaru entered into a partnership with the French grand couturier Dominique Sirop to produce Dominique Sirop for Daimaru, a high fashion prêt-à-porter (ready-to-wear) label.

Locations (Japan)
Shinsaibashi, Osaka - 7–1, Shinsaibashi Itchome, Chūō-ku. The main Daimaru department store, founded as Matsuya in 1726.  Along Mido-suji.  Daimaru's corporate headquarters were located nearby, at 4–10, Minamisenba Yonchome.
 Umeda, Osaka - 1-1, Umeda Sanchome, Kita-ku.  Opened in 1983.  At South Gate Building in the south of Osaka Station.
 Kyoto - 79, Shijo Takakura, Shimogyo-ku Kyoto. Opened in 1912. Along Shijō Dōri, north-east side of Karasuma Station.
 Yamashina - 91, Takehana Takenokaido-cho, Yamashina-ku Kyoto.  South of Yamashina Station.
 Kobe - 40, Akashicho, Chūō-ku, Kobe.  Opened in 1927.  Located in the south of Kyukyoryuchi-Daimarumae Station.
 Shin-Nagata - Nagata-ku, Kobe
 Suma - Suma-ku, Kobe
 Ashiya - near JR West Ashiya Station
 Tokyo - 9–1, Marunouchi Itchome, Chiyoda-ku, inside the new North Tower of the Tokyo Station Twin Towers. Opened in 2007.
Urawa PARCO - Urawa-ku, Saitama
LaLaPort Yokohama - Tsuzuki-ku, Yokohama
 Sapporo - 4–7, Kitagojonishi, Chūō-ku, inside Sapporo Station. Opened in 2003.
 Stores operated by subsidiary companies in Fukuoka and Nagasaki (Hakata Daimaru K.K.), Shimonoseki, Tottori, Imabari, and Kōchi.

References

External links

 Daimaru official website 
 Daimaru official website 
  Wiki collection of bibliographic works on Daimaru

Department stores of Japan
Companies based in Osaka Prefecture
Japanese brands
Retail companies established in 1920
J. Front Retailing
1920 establishments in Japan
Defunct department stores of Australia
2007 mergers and acquisitions